Statistics of the American Soccer League II for the 1983 season.

League standings

Playoffs

Bracket

Semi-finals

ASL Championship

References

American Soccer League II (RSSSF)

American Soccer League (1933–1983) seasons
2